Saint-Rémy-sur-Durolle (Auvergnat: Sant Ramèi) is a commune in the Puy-de-Dôme department in Auvergne in central France.

See also
Communes of the Puy-de-Dôme department

References

Saintremysurdurolle